Richard "Dick" Lewis Blinder (June 14, 1935 – September 7, 2006) was an American architect and supporter of historical architectural preservation.

Background and career
Blinder was born in 1935 in New York.  He graduated from the University of Cincinnati School of Architecture and Harvard University's Graduate School of Design before establishing residency in New Jersey.  He was one of the original founders of Beyer Blinder Belle Architects & Planners LLP (BBB)"Beyer Blinder Belle", an international architecture firm based in New York City and Washington, DC.  The firm's name is derived from the three founding partners: John H. Beyer, Richard Blinder, and John Belle. The three architects met in 1961 while working in the New York office of Victor Gruen. The trio developed a specialty in historic preservation.

At the time of his death in September 2006, Blinder was working on the Shanghai Cultural Plaza, a theater project in the Luwan District. The project was commissioned to Beyer Blinder Belle through an international design competition in 2003 for the redevelopment of a full-block site in central Shanghai's largest historic preservation area, the former French Concession. This development was one of the signature projects undertaken by the Chinese government for the Expo 2010.

Beyer Blinder Belle has won three Presidential Design Awards, the Medal of Honor from the American Institute of Architects New York Chapter, and the national AIA Firm Award, as well as other awards.

Notable projects 

This is an incomplete list.

 Empire State Building, New York, NY
 Lincoln Center for the Performing Arts Promenade, New York
 Grand Central Terminal, New York
 Rubin Museum of Art, New York
 15–19 Fulton Street, Manhattan, 1983
 Japan Society, New York
 Ellis Island
 Ford Center for the Performing Arts (now the Lyric Theater)

In 1989, Blinder founded the James Marston Fitch Charitable Foundation, which is dedicated to the curatorial management of the built world. The Richard Blinder Award for architectural studies, a bi-annual grant program, was introduced in August 1997. Conceived by the Fitch Foundation, "" the award highlights studies addressing buildings that integrate preservation and new construction and is inspired by Blinder's ability to preserve architecture through restoration.

Personal life 

Blinder died on a business trip in Shanghai, China in 2006 while designing the Shanghai Cultural Plaza.

References 

2006 deaths
20th-century American architects
Harvard Graduate School of Design alumni
University of Cincinnati alumni
21st-century American architects
1935 births